Scary Hours is the second extended play recorded by Canadian rapper Drake. It was first released on January 19, 2018 by Young Money Entertainment, Cash Money Records and Republic Records. It contains the single "God's Plan", which also appeared on Drake's fifth studio album Scorpion (2018). The EP was revealed to the public via social media shortly before its release. A sequel Scary Hours 2 was released March 5th, 2021.

Background
Following his 2016 album Views and 2017 mixtape More Life, Drake announced the surprise release of the two-song EP Scary Hours on January 19, 2018 featuring the songs "God's Plan" and "Diplomatic Immunity". Several celebrity news outlets commented on the fact that Drake mentions his relationship with singer Jennifer Lopez in the "Diplomatic Immunity" lyric: "2010 was when I lost my halo / 2017 I lost a J. Lo / A Rotterdam trip had me on front page, though". Drake was accused of stealing another artist's cover art on January 22, 2018.

After the release of Scorpion later that year, the EP was removed from streaming services as "God's Plan" was moved to that album. "Diplomatic Immunity" was then reformatted as a standalone single.

Artwork controversy 
The artwork for Scary Hours was accused of plagiarizing a style for a tour poster designed by Collin Fletcher for musical artist Rabit. Both pieces contained a vertical-orientated texted, with a word stylized in a colored Blackletter typeface layered over another word styled in a white and bolded Sans-serif typeface. However, Billboard reported that OVO Sound, Drake's own record label, picked the artwork when it was presented with other options, unaware of the similarities.

Commercial performance  
The two songs combined on the EP sold for 90,000 album equivalent units in the first week.

Track listing
Credits adapted from Tidal.

Notes
  signifies a co-producer
  signifies an additional producer

Release history

References

2018 EPs
Albums produced by Boi-1da
Albums produced by Cardo
Cash Money Records albums
Drake (musician) EPs
Young Money Entertainment albums